The Egypt Development Party is an Egyptian political party made up of former members of the NDP.

References

Political parties in Egypt
Political parties with year of establishment missing